The 2014 WNBA season was the 16th season for the Minnesota Lynx of the Women's National Basketball Association. The Lynx were defending their 2013 WNBA Championship, seeking to become the third franchise to win three titles.  However, their bid fell short as they lost to the Phoenix Mercury in the conference finals.

The Lynx had a positive offseason, re-signing free agent center Janel McCarville and guard Monica Wright, two key components of the 2013 championship team. The Lynx also announced their first uniform sponsor, the Mayo Clinic.

Transactions

Draft

The following are the Lynx's selections in the 2014 WNBA Draft.

Trades

Personnel changes

Additions

Subtractions

Roster

Depth

Schedule

Preseason

|- style="background:#cfc;"
		 | 1 
		 | May 5
		 |  Australia
		 | 
		 | Waltea Rolle (17)
		 | Maya Moore (7)
		 | Tan White (8)
		 | Target Center2550
		 | 1–0
|- style="background:#cfc;"
		 | 2 
		 | May 9
		 |  Phoenix
		 | 
		 | Tan White (16)
		 | Maya Moore and Tricia Liston (6)
		 | Damiris Dantas and Tan White (3)
		 | ESPN Wide World of Sports Complex3194
		 | 2–0
|- style="background:#cfc;"
		 | 3 
		 | May 11
		 | @ Chicago
		 | 
		 | Asia Taylor (18)
		 | Damiris Dantas (9)
		 | Lindsey Moore (8)
		 | ESPN Wide World of Sports Complex3194
		 | 3–0

Regular season

|- style="background:#cfc;"
		 | 1 
		 | May 16
		 | @ Washington
		 | 
		 | Maya Moore (34)
		 | Damiris Dantas (12)
		 | Lindsay Whalen (8)
		 | Verizon Center7395
		 | 1–0
|- style="background:#cfc;"
		 | 2 
		 | May 18
		 | Connecticut
		 | 
		 | Maya Moore (33)
		 | Maya Moore (12)
		 | Lindsay Whalen (4)
		 | Target Center9434
		 | 2–0
|- style="background:#cfc;"
		 | 3 
		 | May 23
		 | @ Tulsa
		 | 
		 | Maya Moore (38)
		 | Maya Moore (13)
		 | Lindsay Whalen (5)
		 | BOK Center6845
		 | 3–0
|- style="background:#cfc;"
		 | 4 
		 | May 24
		 | New York
		 | 
		 | Maya Moore (30)
		 | Damiris Dantas (8)
		 | Janel McCarville (6)
		 | Target Center8323
		 | 4–0
|- style="background:#cfc;"
		 | 5 
		 | May 26
		 | @ Chicago
		 | 
		 | Lindsay Whalen (22)
		 | Janel McCarville (12)
		 | Lindsay Whalen (4)
		 | Allstate Arena6058
		 | 5–0
|- style="background:#cfc;"
		 | 6 
		 | May 30
		 | San Antonio
		 | 
		 | Maya Moore (26)
		 | Maya Moore (9)
		 | McCarville &M. Moore (5)
		 | Target Center8734
		 | 6–0

|- style="background:#cfc;"
		 | 7
		 | June 1
		 | @ San Antonio
		 | 
		 | Seimone Augustus (25)
		 | Maya Moore (9)
		 | Lindsay Whalen (10)
		 | AT&T Center5089
		 | 7–0
|- style="background:#fcc;"
		 | 8 
		 | June 6
		 | @ Seattle
		 | 
		 | Augustus & M. Moore (12) 
		 | Damaris Dantas (8)
		 | Tan White (5)
		 | KeyArena6836 
		 | 7–1
|- style="background:#cfc;"
		 | 9 
		 | June 8
		 | @ Los Angeles
		 | 
		 | Seimone Augustus (26)
		 | Maya Moore (13)
		 | Lindsay Whalen (7)
		 | Staples Center8770
		 | 8–1
|- style="background:#fcc;"
		 | 10
		 | June 13
		 | @ Atlanta
		 | 
		 | Lindsay Whalen (22)
		 | Maya Moore (9)
		 | Seimone Augustus (6)
		 | Philips Arena6684
		 | 8–2
|- style="background:#fcc;"
		 | 11
		 | June 15
		 | Phoenix
		 | 
		 | Maya Moore (13)
		 | Damaris Dantas (12)
		 | Lindsay Whalen (5)
		 | Target Center8957
		 | 8–3
|- style="background:#cfc;"
		 | 12
                 | June 17
		 | @ Los Angeles
		 | 
		 | Maya Moore (31)
		 | Devereaux Peters (6)
		 | Janel McCarville (8)
		 | Staples Center9636
		 | 9–3
|- style="background:#fcc;"
		 | 13
		 | June 18
		 | @ Phoenix
		 | 
		 | Maya Moore (36)
		 | M. Moore & Whalen (4)
		 | Lindsay Whalen (5)
		 | US Airways Center8963
		 | 9–4
|- style="background:#cfc;"
		 | 14
		 | June 20
		 | Washington
		 | 
		 | Maya Moore (20)
		 | Maya Moore (10)
		 | M. Moore & L.Whalen (7)
		 | Target Center8813
		 | 10–4
|- style="background:#cfc;"
		 | 15
                 | June 22
		 | Indiana
		 | 
		 | Maya Moore (25)
		 | M. Moore & Peters (6)
		 | Lindsay Whalen (6)
		 | Target Center8704
		 | 11–4
|- style="background:#fcc;"
		 | 16
		 | June 27
		 | @ Seattle
		 | 
		 | Maya Moore (20)
		 | Maya Moore (10)
		 | Lindsay Whalen (4)
		 | KeyArena6547
		 | 11–5
|- style="background:#cfc;"
		 | 17
                 | June 29
		 | Seattle
		 | 
		 | Janel McCarville (22)
		 | Maya Moore (7)
		 | Maya Moore (7)
		 | Target Center8814
		 | 12–5

|- style="background:#cfc;"
		 | 18
		 | July 3
		 | San Antonio
		 | 
		 | Lindsay Whalen (22)
		 | Janel McCarville (9)
		 | Lindsay Whalen (7)
		 | Target Center7622
		 | 13–5
|- style="background:#fcc;"
		 | 19
		 | July 6
		 | @ New York
		 | 
		 | Maya Moore (25)
		 | Maya Moore (8)
		 | Lindsay Whalen (5)
		 | Madison Square Garden8151
		 | 13–6
|- style="background:#cfc;"
		 | 20 
		 | July 8
		 | Los Angeles
		 | 
		 | Maya Moore (30)
		 | Lindsay Whalen (9)
		 | Devereaux Peters (6)
		 | Target Center7920
		 | 14–6
|- style="background:#cfc;"
		 | 21
		 | July 10
		 | @ Tulsa
		 | 
		 | Maya Moore (33)
		 | Maya Moore (11)
		 | Lindsay Whalen (10)
		 | BOK Center4961
		 | 15–6
|- style="background:#cfc;"
		 | 22
		 | July 13
		 | Seattle
		 | 
		 | Maya Moore (26)
		 | Maya Moore (12)
		 | Lindsay Whalen (7)
		 | Target Center9114
		 | 16–6
|- style="background:#cfc;"
		 | 23
                 | July 16
		 | Tulsa
		 | 
		 | Maya Moore (32)
		 | Damiris Dantas (11)
		 | Moore and Whalen (5)
		 | Target Center16413
		 | 17–6
|- style="background:#cfc;"
		 | 24
		 | July 22
		 | Atlanta
		 | 
		 | Maya Moore (48)
		 | Rebekkah Brunson (12)
		 | Lindsay Whalen (9)
		 | Target Center9332
		 | 18–6
|- style="background:#cfc;"
		 | 25
		 | July 25
		 | San Antonio
		 | 
		 | Seimone Augustus (17)
		 | Maya Moore (8)
		 | Seimone Augustus (6)
		 | Target Center9104
		 | 19–6
|- style="background:#cfc;"
		 | 26
		 | July 27
		 | @ Connecticut
		 |
		 | Maya Moore (17)
		 |Rebekkah Brunson (10)
		 | Maya Moore (4)
		 | Mohegan Sun Arena8019
		 | 20–6
|- style="background:#cfc;"
		 | 27
                 | July 31
		 | Phoenix
		 | 
		 | Maya Moore (20)
		 | Rebekkah Brunson (11)
		 | McCarville & Whalen (5)
		 | Target Center9513
		 | 21–6

|- style="background:#cfc;"
		 | 28
		 | August 2
		 | @ Tulsa
		 | 
		 |Maya Moore (40)
		 | Rebekkah Brunson (9)
		 | Lindsay Whalen (6)
		 | BOK Center6339
		 | 22–6
|- style="background:#cfc;"
		 | 29
		 | August 5
		 | @ Indiana
		 | 
		 | 
		 |
		 | 
		 | Bankers Life Fieldhouse
		 | 23–6
|- style="background:#cfc;"
		 | 30 
		 | August 7
		 | Chicago
		 | 
		 | 
		 |
		 | 
		 | Target Center
		 | 24–6
|- style="background:#fcc;"
		 | 31
		 | August 9
		 | @ Phoenix
		 | 
		 | 
		 |
		 | 
		 | US Airways Center
		 | 24–7
|- style="background:#fcc;"
		 | 32
		 | August 12
		 | Los Angeles
		 | 
		 | 
		 |
		 | 
		 | Target Center
		 | 24–8
|- style="background:#fcc;"
		 | 33
                 | August 15
		 | @ San Antonio
		 | 
		 | 
		 |
		 | 
		 | AT&T Center
		 | 24–9
|- style="background:#cfc;"
		 | 34
		 | August 16
		 | Tulsa
		 | 
		 | Maya Moore (19)
		 | Maya Moore (12)
		 | Lindsay Whalen (9)
		 | Target Center
		 | 25–9

2014 Season standings

Awards and honors

June Player of the Month: Maya Moore
All-Star Game Starter: Maya Moore
All-Star Game Reserve: Seimone Augustus and Lindsay Whalen

References

External links
2014 Minnesota Lynx season at Official Site

Minnesota Lynx seasons
Minnesota
Minnesota Lynx